Natalia Chudzik (born 8 August 1989) is a Polish football attacking midfielder currently playing for Medyk Konin in the Ekstraliga. She previously played for Unia Racibórz after she had a first spell at Medyk Konin. The 2011-12 season marked her Champions League debut.

She is a member of the Polish national team.

International goals

References

1989 births
Living people
Polish women's footballers
Poland women's international footballers
Medyk Konin players
RTP Unia Racibórz players
Place of birth missing (living people)
Women's association football midfielders
Women's association football forwards